Gœrsdorf is a commune in the Bas-Rhin department in Grand Est in north-eastern France. The commune merged with Mitschdorf at the start of 1973.

Gœrsdorf is part of the Northern Vosges Regional Nature Park.

Notable people
Author and priest Joseph Kuntz was born at Gœrsdorf on 25 July 1850: he died on 7 January 1892.  Between those dates he founded the journal "l'Elsässer" with his sponsor, Abbot Muller-Simonis.   (The German language name of the journal recalls the fact that between 1871 and 1918 Alsace was part of Germany).

See also
 Communes of the Bas-Rhin department

References

Communes of Bas-Rhin
Bas-Rhin communes articles needing translation from French Wikipedia